Crown of Stars is a series of epic fantasy novels by American author Alis A. Rasmussen, under the pen-name Kate Elliott. The series consists of seven novels.

Novels
Novels in the series are:
 King's Dragon (1997)
 Prince of Dogs (1998)
 The Burning Stone (1999)
 Child of Flame  (2000)
 The Gathering Storm (2003)
 In the Ruins (2005)
 Crown of Stars (2006)

Storyline overview

Crown of Stars is set in Novaria, a continent inspired by medieval Europe. Over the course of the novels it is revealed that 2,700 years prior to the present a war erupted between humanity and a race of elf-like beings called the Ashioi. Human sorcerers were able to banish the Ashioi homeland to another plane of existence, but in doing so unleashed a vast cataclysm upon the world that devastated much of humankind. Humanity recovered, initially under the rule of the mighty Dariyan Empire, and later under its successor states, guided by the wisdom of the Daisanite Church (which is based on Christianity).

The story opens with the kingdoms of Wender and Varre, unified under the rule of King Henry, threatened by both external and internal threats. Sabella, Henry's elder half-sister, is fomenting rebellion against his rule in Varre, whilst the inhuman Eika have invaded from the north, raiding the north coast and threatening the city of Gent. In King Henry's court there is intrigue brewing as Henry has not chosen an heir from his three legitimate children, and it is well known that he favours his bastard son Sanglant, who by the law cannot inherit the throne.

The series follows the fortunes of two young people, Alain and Liath, as they are drawn into this web of intrigue, eventually learning that the banished Ashioi homeland is being drawn back to Earth, but its return will spark a cataclysm as great as the one that accompanied its departure.

Historical parallels
Crown of Stars is heavily influenced by real history, particularly that of Europe in the early medieval period. In an interview Kate Elliott acknowledged that many of the cultures in her world are drawn directly from real-world sources:
Alba is Britain
 Salia is France
 Varre corresponds to  The Low Countries
 Wendar is Germany
 North Mark is Denmark
 Eikaland corresponds to Norway and Sweden
Polenie is Poland
Salavii are the Slavs
Austra corresponds to Austria
 Ungria corresponds to Hungary
 Karrone is Switzerland
 Darre is Rome, while Aosta is not the  city but the whole of Italy
Arethousa is Byzantium
 Quman represents assorted steppe tribes (Tartars etc.) or the Golden Horde
 Hessi merchants are a parallel of Jewish traders
Ashioi correspond to the Aztecs
 Kartiako is Carthage
 Jinna is Persia
 Andalla is Iberia

Origins
Elliott had long been a major fan of J. R. R. Tolkien's The Lord of the Rings and had planned to write a similar long epic fantasy, but decided to do something a bit different first by writing science fiction, most successfully in the 'Jaran universe. During this time she planned her epic fantasy storyline and drew on real-life history for inspiration. After deciding to take a break from the Jaran series, she began work on Crown of Stars.

The series was originally envisaged as a trilogy, with a sequel trilogy to follow. This expanded to four volumes, and then Elliott chose to split the fourth volume in two after difficulties emerged in the writing process. The series then expanded to six volumes. However, after completion of the sixth volume the publishers decided that at 430,000 words it was too large to be published in one volume, so it was split into two books published four months apart. Thus the series became seven books long.

References

External links
 Interview with Kate Elliott conducted at Chronicles Network (April 2005).

Fantasy novel series
DAW Books books